List of notable or known members of German Student Corps.

A 

 Karl von Abel (1788–1859), Bavarian statesmen
 Horst Ademeit (1912–1944), engineer, fighter pilot, Knight's Cross of the Iron Cross with Oak Leaves; Corps Masovia Königsberg
 Louis Agassiz (1807–1873), Swiss paleontologist, glaciologist, geologist; professor of natural history at University of Neuchâtel and Harvard University, Corps Helvetia Heidelberg, Corps Helvetia Munich
 Heinrich Albers-Schönberg (1865–1921), gynecologist, pioneer of radiology; Corps Suevia Tübingen, Corps Misnia Leipzig
 Heinrich Albert (1874–1960), commercial attaché to the German ambassador to the United States during World War I
 Carl Theodor Albrecht (1843–1915), German astronomer
 Karl Allmenröder (1896–1917), German World War I ace; Corps Teutonia Marburg
 Alois Alzheimer (1864–1915), psychiatrist and neuropathologist; Corps Franconia Würzburg
 Richard Andree (1835–1912), geographer; Corps Lusatia Leipzig
 Asfa-Wossen Asserate (b. 1948), management consultant and author writing in German, a member of the Solomonic dynasty; Corps Suevia Tübingen
 William Backhouse Astor, Sr. (1792–1875), American businessman; Corps Curonia Göttingen

B 

 Eduard Bacher (1846–1908), Austrian jurisconsult and journalist
 Hermann von Barth (1845–1876), mountaineer; Corps Franconia München
 Adolf Tortilowicz von Batocki-Friebe (1868–1944), member of the Prussian House of Lords, Corps Borussia Bonn
 Walter Bauer (1877–1960), theologist, scholar of the development of the early Christian churches; Corps Hasso-Nassovia Marburg
 Rudolf Baumbach (1840–1905), poet; Corps Thuringia Jena
 Paul Bäumer (1896–1927), German ace in World War I; Corps Suevo-Borussia Berlin
 Friedrich Bayer (1825–1880), founder of Bayer, Corps Saxonia Bonn
 Hans Hermann Behr (1818–1904), German-American physician, botanist, entomologist; Corps Marchia Halle, Corps Moenania Würzburg
 Emil Adolf von Behring (1854–1917), German physiologist, first Nobel Prize in Physiology or Medicine (1907); Corps Suevo-Borussia Berlin
 Rudolf von Bennigsen (1824–1902), politician and leader of the National Liberals; Corps Hannovera Göttingen, Corps Vandalia Heidelberg
 Friedrich von Berg (1866–1939), last chairman of the Secret Civil Cabinet of Kaiser Wilhelm II, grave-digger of the German monarchy; Corps Borussia Bonn
 Gustav Adolf Bergenroth (1813–1869), historian (Tudors, Spain); Corps Masovia Königsberg
 Julius Bergmann (1840–1904), philosopher, Corps Teutonia-Hercynia Göttingen
 Otto Julius Bierbaum (1865–1910), writer; Corps Thuringia Leipzig
 Julius Binder (1870–1939), philosopher; Corps Bavaria Würzburg
 Otto Binswanger (1852–1929), Swiss psychiatrist and neurologist; Corps Suevia Heidelberg, Corps Tigurinia Zürich
 Carl-Heinz Birnbacher (1910–1991), Knight's Cross of the Iron Cross, Konteradmiral of the Bundesmarine; Corps Schacht Leoben
 Herbert von Bismarck (1849–1904), Minister for Foreign Affairs; Corps Borussia Bonn
 Otto von Bismarck (1815–1898), Chancellor of the German Empire; Corps Hannovera Göttingen
 Hinrich Bitter-Suermann (b. 1940), German-Canadian Professor of Surgery (organ transplantation); Corps Nassovia Würzburg, Corps Hannovera Göttingen
 Heinrich Blochmann (1838–1878), iranist in Kolkata; Corps Lusatia Leipzig
 Erich Bloedorn (1902–1975), Colonel and bomber pilot in WW 2, Knight's Cross of the Iron Cross; Corps Masovia Königsberg
 Johannes Blume (d. 1892), Brevet Brigadier General 32nd Regiment Indiana Infantry; Corps Saxonia Bonn, Corps Hannovera Göttingen
 Wilhelm von Bode (1845–1929), German art historian and museum director, founder of Bode Museum; Corps Brunsviga Göttingen
 Ernst von Bodelschwingh-Velmede (1794–1854), Prussian politician, Corps Guestphalia Göttingen
 Karl von Bodelschwingh-Velmede (1800–1873), Prussian politician; Corps Guestphalia Göttingen
 Eduard Böcking (1802–1870), legal scholar; Corps Hassia Heidelberg (suspended)
 Franz Böhm (1895–1977), politician, lawyer, and economist; Corps Rhenania Freiburg
 Caesar Rudolf Boettger (1888–1976), German zoologist, Corps Guestphalia Bonn, Corps Silesia Breslau
 Karl Heinrich von Boetticher (1833–1907), Secretary of the Interior (1880–1897), and Vice Chancellor of Germany (1881–1897); Corps Nassovia Würzburg
 Ernst Bolbrinker (1898–1962), mining engineer, Generalmajor, Knight's Cross of the Iron Cross, Afrikakorps; Corps Schacht Leoben
 Otto Bollinger (1843–1909), pathologist (fowlpox); Corps Suevia München
 Robert Bonnet (1851–1921), anatomist; Corps Suevia München, Corps Brunsviga Göttingen
 Franz Bracht (1877–1933), politician; Corps Rhenania Würzburg
 Curt Bräuer (1889–1969), diplomat, Corps Lusatia Breslau, Corps Guestfalia Greifswald
 Friedrich Gustav von Bramann (1854–1913), surgeon (tracheostomy on Crown Prince Friedrich Wilhelm; Corps Hansea Königsberg
 Karl Ferdinand Braun (1850–1918), physicist, Nobel laureate in physics 1909 (with Guglielmo Marconi); Corps Teutonia Marburg
 Magnus von Braun (senior) (1878–1972), jurist and politician; Corps Saxonia Göttingen
 Alfred Brehm (1829–1884), zoologist, Brehms Tierleben; Corps Saxonia Jena
 Eberhard von Breitenbuch (1910–1980), cavalry officer in the German resistance; Corps Silvania Tharandt
 Lorenzo Brentano (1813–1891), German journalist, member of the Frankfurt Assembly and U.S. Representative from Illinois; Corps Allemannia Heidelberg
 Alois von Brinz (1820–1887), jurist and politician; Corps Suevia München, Corps Franconia Prag
 Wilhelm Brückner (1884–1954), until 1940 Adolf Hitler's chief adjutant; Corps Transrhenania München
 Heinrich Brunn (1822–1894), archaeologist, Corps Palatia Bonn
 Bernhard Ernst von Bülow (1815–1879), secretary of state; Corps Vandalia Göttingen
 Heinrich von Bülow (1792–1846), prussian statesman; Corps Vandalia Heidelberg
 Walter von Bülow-Bothkamp (1894–1918), German World War I ace; Corps Vandalia Heidelberg

C 

 Petre P. Carp (1837–1919), Prime Minister of Romania; Corps Borussia Bonn
 Charles Augustus, Hereditary Grand Duke of Saxe-Weimar-Eisenach, Corps Saxo-Borussia Heidelberg
 Charles Edward, Duke of Saxe-Coburg and Gotha (1884–1958), last reigning Duke of Saxe-Coburg and Gotha; Corps Borussia Bonn
 Maximilian Joseph von Chelius (1794–1876), surgeon and ophthalmologist; Corps Suevia Heidelberg
 Adolf Karl Ludwig Claus (1838–1900), chemist, known for his structure of benzene proposed in 1867; Corps Teutonia Marburg
 Carl Friedrich Wilhelm Claus, Corps Hasso-Nassovia Marburg
 Julius Friedrich Cohnheim (1839–1884), pathologist; Corps Nassovia Würzburg
 Gerhard Conrad (pilot) (1895–1982), Generalleutnant of the Luftwaffe; Corps Hercynia München, Corps Frankonia Brünn
 Constantine I of Greece (1868–1923), King of the Hellenes, Duke of Sparta; Corps Saxo-Borussia Heidelberg
 Alexander Conze (1831–1914), archaeologist, secretary of the German Archaeological Institute; Corps Brunsviga Göttingen
 Wilhelm Paul Corssen (1820–1875), philologist; Corps Marchia Berlin
 Carl Hermann Credner (1841–1913), German earth scientist
Vincenz Czerny (1842–1916), surgeon; Corps Austria Frankfurt

D 

 Gottlieb Daimler (1834–1900), pioneer of internal-combustion engines and automobile development; Corps Stauffia Stuttgart<ref>Horst Grimm/Leo Besser-Walzel, Die Corporationen, Frankfurt am Main, 1986</ref>
 Werner Dankwort (1895–1986), diplomat bringing Germany into the League of Nations in 1926 prior to representing the German contingent in the Organisation for European Economic Co-operation, the post-World War II effort known as the Marshall Plan, Corps Vandalia-Teutonia Berlin
 Siegfried Dehn (1799–1858), music theorist, editor, teacher and librarian; Corps Saxonia Leipzig
 Max Delbrück (1850–1919), German agricultural chemist; Corps Cimbria Berlin
 Ernst von Delius (1912–1937), racing car driver; Corps Franconia München
 Nicolaus Delius (1813–1888), philologist; Corps Guestphalia Bonn
 Georg Diederichs (1900–1983), politician (SPD), Prime Minister of Lower Saxony; Corps Teutonia-Hercynia Göttingen
 Johann Friedrich Dieffenbach (1792–1847), plastic surgeon, Corps Pomerania Greifswald
 Rudolf Diels (1900–1957), SS-Oberführer, in charge of the Gestapo from 1933 to 1934; Corps Rhenania Straßburg
 Arnold Diestel (1857–1924), First Mayor of Hamburg; Corps Hasso-Borussia Freiburg
 Franz von Dingelstedt (1814–1881), poet, dramatist and theatre administrator; Corps Schaumburgia Marburg
 Herbert von Dirksen (1882–1955), ambassador to Britain; Corps Saxo-Borussia Heidelberg
 Rudolf Doehn (1821–1895), Forty-Eighter, fought in the Union Army; Corps Guestphalia Halle
 Claudius Dornier (1884–1969), founder of Dornier GmbH; Corps Suevo-Guestphalia München
 Ludwig Draxler (1896–1972), Austrian Secretary of Finance; Corps Rhaetia Innsbruck
 Julius Dreschfeld (1845–1907), leading British physician and pathologist; Corps Franconia Würzburg
 Jakob Dubs (1822–1879), member of the Swiss Federal Council; Corps Helevetia Heidelberg (suspended)
 Georg Ferdinand Duckwitz (1904–1973), ambassador to Denmark, Righteous among the Nations; Corps Rhenania Freiburg

 E 

 Hermann Ebbinghaus (1850–1909), psychologist; Corps Guestphalia Bonn

 Georg Ebers (1837–1898), egyptologist and novelist, discovered the Ebers Papyrus; Corps Saxonia Göttingen
 Victor von Ebner (1842–1925), Austrian anatomist and histologist; Corps Rhaetia Innsbruck
 Walter Eckhardt (1906–1994), member of the Bundestag and Member of the European Parliament; Corps Teutonia Marburg
 Marc S. Ellenbogen, US Presidential Advisor, diplomat and philanthropist; Corps Rheno-Nicaria zu Mannheim und Heidelberg
 Wilhelm Endemann (1825–1899), legal scholar, member of the Reichstag; Corps Teutonia Marburg
 Johann Georg Veit Engelhardt (1791–1855), theologian; Corps Franconia II Erlangen
 Friedrich Erismann, (1842–1915), Swiss ophthalmologist and hygienist; Corps Tigurinia Zürich
 Ernst II, Prince of Hohenlohe-Langenburg (1863–1950), Corps Suevia Tübingen, Corps Borussia Bonn
 Ernst I, Duke of Saxe-Altenburg (1826–1908), Corps Franconia Jena, Corps Saxo-Borussia Heidelberg
 Ernst II, Duke of Saxe-Altenburg (1871–1955), Corps Franconia Jena

 Walter Eucken, protagonist of the social market economy; Corps Saxonia Kiel
 Botho zu Eulenburg (1831–1912), Prussian prime minister (1892–1894)
 Hanns Heinz Ewers (1871–1943), actor and writer; Corps Normannia Berlin, Corps Alemannia Wien

 F 

 Paul Falkenberg (1848–1925), botanist; Corps Hildesia IV Göttingen
 Gottfried Feder (1883–1941), economist, one of the early key members of the Nazi party; Corps Isaria München
 Max Fesca (1846–1917), agricultural scientist, hired by the Meiji government of Japan as a foreign advisor from 1882 to 1894; Corps Teutonia-Hercynia Göttingen

 Carl Flügge (1847–1923), bacteriologist and hygienist; Corps Bremensia Göttingen

 Max von Forckenbeck (1821–1891), politician, founder of the German Progress Party and National Liberal Party, Berlin mayor, Reichstag president; Corps Teutonia Giessen
 Gustav Freytag (1816–1895), dramatist and novelist, Pour le Mérite; Corps Borussia Breslau
 Frederick II, Grand Duke of Baden (1857–1928), Corps Saxo-Borussia Heidelberg, Corps Borussia Bonn, Corps Suevia Heidelberg
 Prince Frederick Charles of Hesse (1868–1940), King of Finland; Corps Suevia Freiburg
 Frederick Francis IV, Grand Duke of Mecklenburg (1882–1945); Corps Borussia Bonn, Corps Visigothia Rostock
 Wilhelm von Freeden (1822–1894), mathematician, navigation lecturer, founder of the North German Naval Observatory; Corps Guestphalia Bonn, Corps Frisia Göttingen
 Karl Rudolf Friedenthal, Prussian statesman; Corps Silesia Breslau
 Nikolaus Friedreich, pathologist and neurologist; Corps Rhenania Würzburg
 Friedrich, Prince of Waldeck and Pyrmont, Corps Bremensia Göttingen
 Richard Frommel, Corps Suevia München, Corps Brunsviga Göttingen, Corps Rhenania Würzburg
 August von Froriep, Corps Saxonia Göttingen
 Otto Froitzheim (1884–1962), tennis champion; Corps Teutonia Bonn
 Karl Fürstner, neurologist and psychiatrist; Corps Nassovia Würzburg

 G 

 Georg von der Gabelentz, linguist, sinologist; Corps Franconia Jena
 Friedrich Balduin von Gagern (1794–1848), German general, Corps Hannovera Göttingen
 Wilhelm von Gayl, Secretary of Interior; Corps Saxonia Göttingen, Corps Borussia Bonn
 Karl Geiler, Prime Minister of Hessen; Corps Rhenania Freiburg
 Heinrich Gelzer, classical scholar; Corps Alamannia Basel
 Kurt Gerstein (1905–1945), German SS officer, tried to inform the international public about the Holocaust, author of the Gerstein Report, Corps Teutonia Marburg
 Robert Gersuny (1844–1924), Austrian surgeon
 Gustaw Gizewiusz, pastor in Mazovia; Corps Masovia Königsberg
 Themistocles Gluck, surgeon, inaugurator of joint replacement; Corps Saxonia Leipzig
 Heinrich Ernst Göring, colonial governor of German South-West Africa, father of Hermann Göring; Corps Saxonia Bonn
 August Görtz, civil servant and politician; Corps Hannovera Göttingen.
 Eugen Freiherr von Gorup-Besanez, chemist; Corps Bavaria München
 Gustav Graef, painter; Corpslandsmannschaft Normannia Königsberg
 Hans Grässel, architect, Pour le Mérite; Corps Rheno-Palatia München
 Ferdinand Gregorovius, journalist and historian, honorary citizen of Rome; Corps Masovia Königsberg
 Paul Güssfeldt, geologist, mountaineer and explorer, Corps Vandalia Heidelberg

 H 

 Klaus Hänsch
 Albrecht von Hagen, Wehrmacht officer, German resistance, executed; Corps Saxo-Borussia Heidelberg.

 Werner Hartenstein, commander of German submarine U-156, Knight's cross of the Iron Cross; Corps Hasso-Borussia Freiburg
 Emil Hartwich, Corps Rhenania Heidelberg
 Ulrich von Hassell, diplomat, German resistance, executed; Corps Suevia Tübingen
 Hermann von Hatzfeldt, Corps Saxonia GöttingenKösener Corpslisten 1930, 47, 264
 Friedrich Hecker, Corps Rhenania Heidelberg, Corps Hassia Heidelberg, Corps Palatia Heidelberg
 Justus Hecker, founder of historical pathology, Corps Marchia Berlin
 Johann Gustav Heckscher, minister resident; Corps Guestphalia Heidelberg
 Heinrich Heine (1797–1856), significant German poet of the 19th century, Corps Guestphalia Göttingen
 Karl Heinzen (1809–1880), revolutionary author; Corps Guestphalia Bonn
 Vollrath von Hellermann, Generalmajor of the Wehrmacht, Knight's Cross of the Iron Cross; Corps Saxonia Göttingen
 Wilhelm Hemprich, naturalist and explorer; Corps Teutonia Breslau, Corps Borussia Breslau
 Paul Hensel, pastor, defender of Mazovia; Corps Masovia
 Rudolph Hering, American engineer, Corps Altsachsen Dresden
 Alfred Herrhausen
 Jürgen Herrlein
 Wilhelm Hertz, rediscovered writer; Corps Teutonia Stuttgart, Corps Franconia Tübingen
 Walther Herwig (1838–1912), Prussian administrative lawyer, and the founder of the German fisheries science, Corps Hannovera Göttingen
 Otto Hesse, mathematician; Corps Masovia Königsberg.
 Hermann Theodor Hettner, literary historian; Corps Silesia Berlin, Corps Saxo-Borussia Heidelberg
 Prince Frederick Charles of Hesse
 Carl von Heyden, Corps Rhenania Heidelberg

 William Hillebrand, founder of the Hawaii Medical Association and Foster Botanical Garden in Honolulu; Corps Hanseatia Göttingen und Corps Saxo-Borussia Heidelberg
 Paul von Hindenburg, Generalfeldmarschall, Reichspräsident; Corps Montania Freiberg
 Eduard Hitzig, neuropsychiatrist, Corps Nassovia Würzburg, Corps Neoborussia Berlin
 Leopold von Hoesch, diplomat; Corps Saxo-Borussia Heidelberg
 Andreas Gottlieb Hoffmann, theologian and orientalist; Corps Teutonia Halle
 Heinrich Hoffmann, psychiatrist, author of Struwwelpeter; Corps Allemannia Heidelberg
 Anton Friedrich Hohl, obstetrician; Corps Thuringia Leipzig, founder of Corps Saxonia Leipzig
 Karl Christian Johann Holsten, theologian; Corps Misnia Leipzig, Corps Vandalia Rostock
 Joachim Wilhelm Franz Philipp von Holtzendorff, jurist
 Caspar Alexander Honthumb, contributing editor New Yorker Staats-Zeitung, Cincinnati Volksfreund, Puck, Corps Hannovera Göttingen
 Johann Friedrich Horner (1831–1886), Swiss ophthalmologist, Corps Tigurinia Zürich

 House of Hohenzollern
 Prince Eitel Friedrich of Prussia (1883–1942), Prussian prince and general; Corps Borussia Bonn
 Prince Friedrich Karl of Prussia, Corps Borussia Bonn
 Prince Henry of Prussia, brother of Wilhelm II, Großadmiral; Corps Holsatia Kiel
 Prince Oskar of Prussia, Generalmajor, Herrenmeister of the Johanniterorden; Corps Borussia Bonn, Corps Saxo-Borussia Heidelberg
 Prince Sigismund of Prussia, Corps Brandenburgia Berlin (Cleveland)
 Wilhelm II, German Emperor, Corps Borussia Bonn
 William, German Crown Prince, Corps Borussia Bonn
 Prince Waldemar of Prussia (1889–1945); Corps Holsatia Kiel
 Prince Wilhelm of Prussia, Corps Borussia Bonn
 Francis Huebschmann (German: Franz Hübschmann), 1817–1880), 1851–1852 and 1871–1872 senator in Wisconsin, "best physician" of the Union Army; Corps Saxonia Jena
 Ferdinand Hueppe, bacteriologist, military surgeon, first German Football Association president; Corps Alemannia Berlin
 Carl Hueter, surgeon, member of the Reichstag; Corps Teutonia Marburg

 J 

 Hermann Jacobi (1850–1937), indologist, Corps Teutonia Bonn
 Otto Jaekel, paleontologist, geologist; Corps Lusatia Breslau, Corps Guestfalia Greifswald
 Duke John Albert of Mecklenburg
 Philipp von Jolly, physicist, mathematician; Corps Hassia Heidelberg
 Carl Friedrich Wilhelm Jordan, writer and politician; Corps Littuania.
 Heinz Jost, SS Brigadeführer; Corps Hassia Gießen
 Hugo Junkers (1859–1935), innovative engineer (gas engines, aeroplanes), Corps Delta Aachen

 K 

 Karl Kaiser (b. 1934), Harvard professor, co-worker of Henry Kissinger; Corps Hansea Köln
 Manfred Kanther
 Friedrich Kapp, Corps Suevia Heidelberg
 Wolfgang Kapp (1858–1922), nominal leader of the so-called Kapp Putsch, Corps Hannovera Göttingen
 Walther Kausch, surgeon, pioneer of pancreaticoduodenectomy; Corps Palaio-Alsatia Straßburg
 Albert Keller, German painter, Corps Isaria München
 Ott-Heinrich Keller (1906–1990), German mathematician; Corps Austria
 Wilhelm Emmanuel Freiherr von Ketteler
 Wilhelm Kiesselbach, ENT surgeon; Corps Hildeso-Guestphalia Göttingen, Corps Hasso-Nassovia Marburg
 Mitchell Campbell King (1815–1901), American planter and physician in the Carolinas, Corps Hannovera Göttingen
 Georg Kloss (1787–1854), German historian of freemasonry, Corps Hannovera Göttingen
 William August Kobbé, United States Army officer; Corps Franconia Freiberg
 Wolfgang Franz von Kobell, mineralogist, writer in Bavarian dialect; Corps Isaria München Corps
 Hans Koch, jurist, officer in both World Wars, member of the German resistance, executed; Corps Baltia Königsberg
 Eberhard von Koerber, past CEO of ABB Group, co-president of the Club of Rome; Corps Saxo-Borussia Heidelberg
 Erwin Guido Kolbenheyer (1878–1962), Austrian novelist, poet and playwright; Corps Symposion Wien
 Franz König, Corps Teutonia Marburg.
 Theodor Körner, German poet and soldier
 Werner Körte (1853–1937), German surgeon; Corps Teutonia Bonn
 Ludwig Kohl-Larsen, anthropologist, explorer
 Herbert Kraus, Corps Saxonia Göttingen
 Adalbert Krüger, Corps Marchia Berlin
 Jacob Kuechler (1823–1893), he pioneered the science of Dendrochronology to date natural events, Corps Starkenburgia Gießen.
 Hermann Kümmell, Corps Nassovia Würzburg
 Eberhard von Kuenheim (b. 1928), German industrial manager, long time CEO BMW-Group, Corps Teutonia Stuttgart
 Adolph Kussmaul (1822–1902), German physician and a leading clinician of his time, Corps Suevia Heidelberg
 Otto Küstner, Corps Lusatia Leipzig
 Hermann Kuhnt, ophthalmologist

 L 

 Hans Heinrich Landolt, Swiss chemist
 Bernhard von Langenbeck, surgeon
 Arnold von Lasaulx, mineralogist and petrographer
 Eduard Schmidt von der Launitz (1796–1869), German sculptor, Corps Curonia Göttingen
 Robert Lehr, Corps Teutonia Marburg
 Helmut Lemke
 Max Lenz, historian
 Heinrich Leo, Prussian historian and politician
 Ernst Levy von Halle, Jewish propaganda chief of Alfred von Tirpitz
 Wilhelm Liebknecht
 Justus von Liebig (1803–1873), German chemist and Gießen University faculty, Corps Rhenania Erlangen I (suspended ...)
 Franz Joseph II, Prince of Liechtenstein
 Joseph von Lindwurm, physician and dermatologist, Corps Bavaria Würzburg
 Hermann Lingg, poet
 Rudolf Lipschitz, mathematician
 Friedrich Loeffler
 Carl Ludwig, Corps Hasso-Nassovia Marburg
 Georg Albert Lücke, surgeon

 M 

 Helmuth von Maltzahn
 August von Mackensen (1849–1945), German field marshal, Corps Agronomia Göttingen
 Otto Theodor von Manteuffel, Prussian statesman; Corps Saxonia Halle
 Georg von Manteuffel-Szoege, politician
 Adolf Marschall von Bieberstein
 Walter Masing, physicist; Corps Misnia IV
 Ludwig Maurer, mathematician; Corps Suevia München
 Albert von Maybach, Under Secretary of State in thPrussian Ministry of Trade; Corps Hansea Bonn
 Christian Gustav Adolph Mayer, Corps Hildeso-Guestphalia Göttingen
 Prince Maximilian of Baden (1867–1929), last imperial chancellor of Germany
 Friedrich Sigmund Merkel, anatomist; Corps Baruthia Erlangen
 Hanns von Meyenburg (1887–1971), Swiss Pathologist, Corps Tigurinia Zürich
 Georg Michaelis
 Julius von Michel, ophthalmologist; Corps Rhenania Würzburg
 Julius Rudolph Ottomar Freiherr von Minutoli
 Julius von Mirbach, member of the Prussian House of Lords; Corps Borussia Bonn
 Eilhard Mitscherlich, chemist; Corps Guestphalia Heidelberg
 Carl Joseph Anton Mittermaier
 Woldemar Mobitz, Corps Rhenania Freiburg
 Paul Georg von Möllendorff, sinologist, diplomat; Corps Normannia-Halle
 Andreas Mölzer
 Hans Adolf von Moltke
 Ludwig Mond
 Franz Mone, Corps Suevia Heidelberg
 Hans Much, hygienist, writer; Corps Teutonia Marburg
 Alfons Mumm von Schwarzenstein (1859–1924), diplomat of the German Empire, successor of the murdered Baron Clemens von Ketteler as ambassador in Beijing in 1900, Corps Hannovera Göttingen
 Jean de Muralt, Corps Tigurinia Zürich

 N 

 Gustav Nachtigal (1834–1885), explorer of Central and West Africa; Corps Palaiomarchia Halle, Corps Nassovia Würzburg, Corps Pomerania Greifswald
 Bernhard Naunyn, pharmacologist; Corps Hansea Bonn
 Rudolf Nebel
 Fritz Neumayer, Federal Minister; Corps Rhenania Würzburg
 Konstantin von Neurath, Corps Suevia Tübingen
 Otto Nüsslin (1850–1915), Zoologist at the TH Karlsruhe university, Corps Hubertia Freiburg

 O 
 Maximilian Oberst, surgeon; Corps Isaria München
 Otto von Oehlschläger, president of the Reichsgericht; founder of the Corps Baltia Königsberg
 Goetz Oertel, physicist, past president of Association of Universities for Research in Astronomy (AURA), Associate of the National Academy of Sciences; Corps Masovia Königsberg
 Wilhelm von Opel, founder of Opel; Corps Franconia Darmstadt
 Max von Oppenheim (1860–1946), ancient historian and archaeologist; Corps Palatia Straßburg
 Robert von Ostertag, veterinarian; Corps Suevia Stuttgart

 P 

 Hans von Pechmann, chemist; Corps Isaria München
 Elias Peissner, Professor at Union College; Corps Palatia München, Corps Alemannia München; member of Sigma Phi and Phi Beta Kappa Society, fallen in the Battle of Chancellorsville
 Hugo Karl Anton Pernice, gynecologist and obstetrician, Corps Hannovera Göttingen, Corps Teutonia Göttingen
 Maximilian Perty, zoologist in Berne; Corps Isaria München
 Carl Wilhelm Petersen
 Hubert Petschnigg, architect; Corps Hansea Wien, Corps Marchia Brünn.
 Baron Karl Ludwig von der Pfordten, legal scholar and politician; Corps Onoldia Erlangen
 Kurt Plötner, SS physician, recruited by US intelligence; Corps Thuringia Leipzig
 Count Franz Pocci, artist and composer; Corps Isaria München
 Alfred Pribram, Jewish physician in Prague; Corps Austria
 Robert Prutz, poet and critic; Corps Borussia Halle

 Q 
 Reinhold Quaatz, civil servant, right-wing politician, half-Jewish in ancestry; Corps Guestphalia Jena

 R 

 Count von Racowitza, Corps Neoborussia Berlin
 Joseph Maria von Radowitz, Jr., Foreign Secretary; Corps Borussia Bonn
 Hanns Albin Rauter, highest SS and Police Leader in the occupied Netherlands, executed; Corps Joannea Graz
 Count Johann Bernhard von Rechberg und Rothenlöwen, Austrian statesman; Corps Isaria München
 William Reed (Union Army) (1825–1864), highest ranking African American line officer in the U. S. army during the civil war; Corps Saxonia KielKösener Korps-Listen 1910, 135, 48
 Oskar von Redwitz, poet; Corps Franconia München
 Ludwig Rehn, surgeon; Corps Hasso-Nassovia Marburg
 Joseph Martin Reichard, Corps Rhenania Heidelberg
 Ernst Julius Remak, neurologist; Corps Borussia Breslau
 August Leopold von Reuss (1841–1924), Austrian ophthalmologist; Corps Austria
 Gregor von Rezzori (1914–1998), Austrian novelist and screenwriter, Corps Schacht Leoben
 Friedrich Julius Richelot, mathematician; Corps Masovia Königsberg
 Sigmund von Riezler, historian; Corps Isaria München
 Eduard von Rindfleisch, pathologist; Corps Saxo-Borussia Heidelberg
 Friedrich Wilhelm Ritschl, Corps Lusatia Leipzig
 Hans Joachim von Rohr, agrarian, politician; Corps Saxo-Borussia Heidelberg
 Paul Rohrbach
 Otto Roquette, poet; Corps Teutonia Berlin
 Wilhelm Roscher (1817–1894), economist; Corps Hannovera Göttingen
 Alfred Rosenberg, Corps Rubonia Riga
 Eugen Rosshirt, Corps Bavaria Würzburg
 August von Rothmund, ophthalmologist; Corps Isaria München
 Friedrich Rückert, poet, orientalist; Corps Franconia Würzburg

 S 

 Wilhelm von Salisch, Oberst, Knight's Cross of the Iron Cross with Oakleaves; Corps Saxonia Göttingen
 Gustav von Saltzwedel, Prussian civil servant; founder of the Corps Littuania Königsberg
 Hans Sandrock (1913–1995), officer of the German Army during World War II, decorated with the Knight's Cross of the Iron Cross, Corps Pomerania-Silesa
 Julius Scharlach (1842–1908), Hamburg lawyer, businessman and a prominent figure in the colonial history of Germany, Corps Hannovera Göttingen
 Max Schede, surgeon; Corps Borussia Halle, Corps Tigurinia Zürich
 Rudolf von Scheliha, diplomat, member of the German resistance, executed; Corps Saxo-Borussia Heidelberg
 Gustav Schleicher (1823–1879), German-born Democratic United States Representative from Texas, veteran of the Confederate Army; Corps Starkenburgia GießenBiographical Directory of the United States Congress
 Alexander von Schleinitz, Foreign Minister of Prussia; Corps Saxonia Halle
 Friedrich Ferdinand, Duke of Schleswig-Holstein (1913–1989), Oberst of the Wehrmacht; Corps Saxonia Göttingen
 Hanns Martin Schleyer, Corps Suevia Heidelberg
 Wilhelm Philipp Daniel Schlich (1840–1925), forester in India; Corps Hassia Gießen
 Ernst Reinhold Schmidt (1819–1901), spokesman of the German immigrants in Philadelphia, author of The History of the American Civil War and The Founding of Pennsylvania: the German View of our Bi-centennial (1882); Corps Masovia Königsberg
 Edzard Schmidt-Jortzig, legal scholar and past Federal Minister; Corps Hansea Bonn
 Otto Schott, industrialist, inventor of borosilicate glass; Corps Teutonia Braunschweig
 Karl Ludwig Ernst Schroeder, gynecologist; Corps Nassovia Würzburg
 Fritz-Dietlof von der Schulenburg officer, German Resistance, executed; Corps Saxonia Göttingen
 Max Schuler, Schuler tuning, gyrocompass; Corps Franconia München
 Ernst Schulze (1789–1817), German romantic poet, Corps Hannovera Göttingen
 Robert Schumann, composer; Corps Saxo-Borussia Heidelberg
 Berent Schwineköper (1912–1993), historian; Corps Teutonia Göttingen
 Hans-Christoph Seebohm, federal minister; Corps Hasso-Borussia Freiburg
 Franz Seldte, founder and Leader of Der Stahlhelm, Minister for Labour of the German Reich; Corps Teutonia-Hercynia Braunschweig
 Friedrich Wilhelm Semmler, chemist; Corps Silesia Breslau
 Carl Semper, Corps Visurgia Hannover
 Eduard Caspar Jacob von Siebold, gynecologist; Corps Lusatia Berlin, Corps Lusatia Leipzig
 Philipp Franz von Siebold, Corps Moenania Würzburg
 Ernst Siehr
 Gustav Simon, surgeon in Heidelberg; Corps Starkenburgia Gießen; Corps Saxo-Borussia Heidelberg
 Eduard von Simson, Jewish-born father of the first German constitution; Littauer-Kränzchen (Corps Littuania Königsberg)
 Reinhold Solger, prominent Forty-Eighter, historian, Professor at West-Point United States Military Academy; Corps Marchia Halle, Corps Guestfalia Greifswald, founder and honorary member of Corps Borussia Greifswald
 Alexander Spengler, founder of Davos medicine; Corps Suevia Heidelberg
 Bernhard Sprengel, industrialist, founder of the Sprengel Museum; Corps Holsatia Kiel
 Martin Stamm, founder of Cleveland Clinic
 Ernst Rüdiger Starhemberg (1899–1956), Austrian politician, 163rd Knight of the Order of the Golden Fleece, Corps Rhaetia Innsbruck now Augsburg
 Hermann Stieve, anatomist; Corps Franconia München
 Christian Friedrich, Baron Stockmar, Corps Onoldia Erlangen, Corps Franconia Würzburg
 Otto of Stolberg-Wernigerode, Corps Saxo-Borussia Heidelberg
 Otto Stolz, Austrian mathematician, his name lives on in the Stolz-Cesàro theorem, Corps Rhaetia Innsbruck now Augsburg;
 Samuel Hanson Stone, Corps Thuringia Leipzig, Corps Rhenania Heidelberg
 Adolph Strecker, chemist; Corps Teutonia Gießen
 Louis Stromeyer (1804–1876), German surgeon, Corps Hannovera Göttingen
 Gustav Struve, Corps Bado-Württembergia Göttingen
 Franz Susemihl, classical philologist; Corps Misnia Leipzig
 Alexander Arkadyevich Suvorov, Prince of Italy, Count Rymniksky (1804–1882), Russian general, diplomat and politician, Corps Curonia Göttingen

 T 

 Ludwig Thoma, Bavarian writer; Corps Suevia München
 Johann Ludwig Wilhelm Thudichum, physician and biochemist; Corps Hassia Gießen
 Heinrich Triepel, legal scholar; Corps Suevia Freiburg
 Adam von Trott zu Solz, member of the German resistance, executed; Corps Saxonia Göttingen

 U 
 Edward Uhl, New Yorker Staats-Zeitung, Corps Rhenania ZAB, Corps Franconia Karlsruhe
 Paul Uhlenhuth, bacteriologist; Corps Franconia Hamburg
 Hermann Ulrici, philosopher; Corps Saxonia Halle

 V 

 Karl von Vierordt, physiologist; Corps Suevia Heidelberg
 Victor II, Duke of Ratibor, Corps Saxonia Göttingen
 Henry Villard, American railroads tycoon; Corps Franconia München
 Carl Vogt
 Carl von Voit, physiologist; Corps Franconia München
 Otto Volger, Corps Hannovera Göttingen
 Richard von Volkmann, surgeon and poet

 W 

 Werner Wachsmuth, "nestor of the German surgeons"; Corps Rhenania Würzburg, Corps Suevia Tübingen
 Johann Andreas Wagner, zoologist; Corps Bavaria Würzburg
 Richard Wagner, composer, Corps Saxonia LeipzigRichard Wagner, Gregor-Dellin (Ed.): Mein Leben. München 1983, p. 51 ff.
 Max Waldau (1825–1855), German poet and novelist, Corps Silesia Breslau
 Benedict Waldeck, left-leaning deputy in the Prussian National Assembly; Corps Guestphalia II Göttingen
 Karl Weierstrass, Corps Saxonia Bonn
 Arthur von Weinberg, industrialist; Corps Transrhenania München
 Christian Samuel Weiss, mineralogist; Corps Montania Freiberg
 Carl Theodor Welcker, legal scholar and liberal politician; Corps Franconia Gießen
 Friedrich Gottlieb Welcker, classical philologist and archaeologist; Corps Lahnania Gießen
 Hermann Welcker, anatomist and anthropologist; Corps Teutonia Gießen, Corps Palatia Bonn
 Karl Weltzien, chemist; Corps Suevia Heidelberg
 Heinrich Wendland, botanist; Corps Hannovera Göttingen
 Horst Wessel, Nazi activist, Horst Wessel Lied; Corps Normannia Berlin, Corps Alemannia Wien
 Moritz Wiggers, jurist and democratic politician; Corps Vandalia Rostock, Corps Hanseatia Rostock, Corps Guestphalia Heidelberg
 William Ernest, Grand Duke of Saxe-Weimar-Eisenach, Corps Borussia Bonn
 William II of Württemberg, Corps Bremensia Göttingen, Corps Suevia Tübingen
 Max Wirth, Corps Rhenania Heidelberg
 Heinrich Wendland, Corps Hannovera Göttingen
 Theodor Wiegand
 Ulrich Wille, Corps Tigurinia Zürich
 Friedrich Hermann Wölfert, publisher and aviation pioneer; founder of the Corps Plavia Leipzig

 Y 

 Nikolay Yazykov, Russian poet, Corps Ruthenia Dorpat
 Yamamoto Teijirō, Japanese industrialist and politician, Corps Germania Hohenheim
 Peter Yorck von Wartenburg, member of the German resistance, executed

 Z 

 Eberhard Zahn (1910–2010), manager, Corps Austria
 Joachim Zahn, CEO Mercedes-Benz, Corps Rhenania Tübingen
 Alfred-Maurice de Zayas, Corps Rhenania Tübingen
 Hans Zehrer
 Ernst Ziehm
 Hermann Zimmer (8 October 1867 in Ocklitz, district Breslau, † 22 April 1928 in Breslau) was a German trade unionist and social democratic politician. Most recently, he was Oberpräsident the Prussian province of Lower Silesia
 Eugen von Zimmerer, Corps Bavaria Würzburg
 Arthur Zimmermann, Imperial Secretary of State (Zimmermann Telegram)
 Franz Heinrich Zitz
 Hans von Zwiedineck-Südenhorst (1845–1906), Austrian historian; Corps Teutonia Graz, Vandalia Graz und Saxonia Wien

 Bibliography 
 Hans-Georg Balder, Rüdiger B. Richter: Korporierte im amerikanischen Bürgerkrieg, Hilden: WJK-Verlg, 2007
 Otto Gerlach: Kösener Corps-Listen 1930, Frankfurt am Main 1930.
 Otto Gerlach: Kösener Corpslisten 1960, Kassel 1961.
 Hermann Kruse: Kösener Corpslisten 1996, Gesamtverzeichnis 1919–1996, Nürnberg-Fürth 1998.
 Rosco G.S. Weber: The German Corps in the Third Reich, Macmillan London 1986
 Stephen Klimczuk, Gerald Warner: Secret Places, Hidden Sanctuaries: Uncovering Mysterious Sights, Symbols, and Societies, Sterling Publishing Company, 2009, p. 224–232 (The German University Corps)

 External links 

 References 
 The Kösener Senioren-Convents-Verband as the oldest umbrella association of German Studentenverbindungen founded in 1848 publishes continuously memberships in its member corps in the Kösener Corpslisten'' beginning with the first edition in 1904. For this purpose the Corps are indicated in bold figures, the individual number of the member in the membership list of his individual corps is the next figure following. The Weinheimer Senioren-Convent as the second oldest association of German Studentenverbindungen does not publish comparable lists of membership for its roughly 60 member corps; therefore this list is based on other available references.

Kösener Senioren-Convents-Verband
Weinheimer Senioren-Convent